State Route 23 (SR 23) is a state highway traversing Whitman and Lincoln counties in the U.S. state of Washington.

SR 23 was formally established in 1964 using roadways that have existed since 1937 as Secondary State Highway 11F (SSF 11C) from Sprague to Harrington and Secondary State Highway 11C (SSH 11C) from Steptoe to Sprague. SSH 11C was removed from Steptoe to Ewan in 1943 and became an extension of Primary State Highway 18 (PSH 18) and was completely designated as PSH 18 in 1953 and removed from the highway system in 1961. A second child route, is proposed to be built from Ritzville to Ewan, but has not been built.

Route description

The road has 2 undivided lanes as it travels west through mostly rural areas and becomes Front Street in Saint John. After entering Lincoln County, the highway crosses over Union Pacific and BNSF rail lines, then passes through Sprague. North of the interchange,  splits off and travels north towards Reardan, being  longer than SR 23. The highway continues northwest into Harrington, intersecting Coal Creek Road serving Harrington High School and becoming Sherlock Street.

History

SR–23 was formally established in 1964, but the roadway has existed as early as 1926. The road was officially added to the state highway system as two highways in 1937 as Secondary State Highway 11C (SSH 11C) from Steptoe to Sprague and Secondary State Highway 11F (SSF 11C) from Sprague to Harrington. SSH 11C was shortened in 1943 to a Ewan–Sprague route and the former section to Steptoe became part of an extension of Primary State Highway 18 (PSH 18). SSH 11C was completely removed from the system in 1951, and it took effect in 1961 as the number was reused elsewhere.

Major intersections

References

External links

Highways of Washington State

023
Transportation in Lincoln County, Washington
Transportation in Whitman County, Washington